Glandular branches of the thyroid artery may refer to:

 Glandular branches of the superior thyroid artery
 Glandular branches of the inferior thyroid artery